Macrotylus quadrilineatus is a species of plant bug belonging to the family Miridae, subfamily Phylinae.

Ecology

The main host plant is Jupiter's Distaff (Salvia glutinosa, Lamiaceae). This plant bug feeds on the juices of the plant and on small insects entrapped on the sticky salvia.

Distribution
It is mainly found in Austria, Italy, Germany, France, Romania, Switzerland,  Slovenia, Poland and  former Yugoslavia.

Description
The body and legs color is black, with four white lines (hence the species name).

References

External links
 Eol.org

Phylinae
Insects described in 1785
Hemiptera of Europe